Viktoria Radeva (born 15 May 2001) is a Bulgarian chess player. She was awarded the title of Woman Grandmaster by FIDE in 2021.

Chess career
In 2011, Radeva won silver at the U-10 World Youth Chess Championship.

She won the Bulgarian Women's Chess Championship in 2018 and 2019.

She qualified to play in the Women's Chess World Cup 2021, where she was defeated 2-0 by Tatev Abrahamyan in the first round.

References

External links

Viktoria Radeva chess games at 365Chess.com

2001 births
Living people
Chess woman grandmasters
Bulgarian female chess players